Private's Progress is a 1956 British comedy film based on the novel by Alan Hackney. It was directed and produced by John and Roy Boulting, from a script by John Boulting and Frank Harvey.

Plot
During the Second World War, young undergraduate Stanley Windrush (Ian Carmichael), is conscripted into the British Army. Unlike his friend, Egan (Peter Jones), Windrush is a most reluctant soldier and struggles through basic training at Gravestone Barracks under Sgt. Sutton (William Hartnell) (Author Hackney spent the first year of his National Service at Maidstone Barracks). Failing his officer selection board, he is posted to a holding unit, under the command of Major Hitchcock (Terry-Thomas). Most of the soldiers there are malingerers and drop-outs, with one of them Private Cox (Richard Attenborough) becoming his mentor in escaping work details and riding on the railway without a ticket.

Windrush is finally posted to train as a Japanese interpreter, where he becomes the prize pupil. He is then contacted by his uncle, Brigadier Tracepurcel (Dennis Price), who rapidly rose from the rank of Major for facilitating profitable business deals for his superior officers and is now a senior officer in the War Office, to join a secret operation known only as Hatrack. He is quickly commissioned and the operation is launched, Windrush becoming an unwitting participant in a scheme ostensibly to recover looted artworks from the Germans but really to steal them and sell them to two crooked art dealers. All are astounded that Windrush was trained in Japanese, rather than German that initially made him desirable to the operation.

Windrush survives the operation where he is captured by British forces whilst in German uniform. No one believes he is British until he comes across Major Hitchcock who is commanding the prisoner of war camp Windrush is at. After being hospitalised for alleged mental illness, he is discharged from the army. Tracepurcel and his associate, Private Cox, fake their deaths. Windrush returns to university after the war and is surprised to receive a visit from Cox, who brings him an attaché case. Cox is arrested as he leaves by Sergeant Sutton, now a Royal Military Policeman; Windrush and Tracepurcel having been tracked as the source of a counterfeit copy of one of the artworks. Windrush innocently reveals to the military police the contents of the case—a large sum of money—and is also arrested, assumed to be complicit in the fraud.

The closing epilogue and dedication states: "To all those who got away with it, this film is most respectfully dedicated."

Cast

 Ian Carmichael as Stanley Windrush
 Richard Attenborough as Private Cox
 Dennis Price as Brigadier Bertram Tracepurcel
 Terry-Thomas as Major Hitchcock
 Peter Jones as Egan
 William Hartnell as Sergeant Sutton
 Thorley Walters as Captain Bootle
 Jill Adams as Prudence Greenslade
 Ian Bannen as Private Horrocks
 Victor Maddern as Private Blake
 Kenneth Griffith as Private Jones
 George Coulouris as Padre
 Derrick De Marney as Pat
 Ronald Adam as Doctor at medical hearing
 Miles Malleson as Windrush Sr.
 Sally Miles as Catherine
 David King-Wood as Gerald
 Brian Oulton as M.O. at Gravestone Camp
 Michael Trubshawe as Col. Fanshawe
 John Le Mesurier as Psychiatrist
 Robert Raglan as Gen. Tomlinson
 Henry Oscar as Art expert
 Christopher Lee as General von Linbeck's aide (uncredited)
 Basil Dignam as Col. Martin (president of Selection Board) (uncredited)
 John Harvey as RAF officer at headquarters (uncredited)
 Glyn Houston as Corporal on sick call (uncredited)
 Lloyd Lamble as Officer at medical hearing (uncredited)
 David Lodge as Lance Corporal on guard duty, Holding Unit (uncredited)
 Marianne Stone as Expectant mother talking to Capt Bootle (uncredited)
 Michael Ward as Sidney (guest at party) (uncredited)
 John Warren as Sergeant Major Gradwick
 Trevor Reid as Adjutant (uncredited)
 Theodore Zichy as German Agent (uncredited)
 Peter Williams as Officer at Selection Board (uncredited)

Production
The film was primarily filmed at Shepperton Studios but some scenes were filmed at Wantage Hall, a hall of residence for the University of Reading.

The War Office refused all requests for cooperation, even after the ending of the film was changed to show the guilty being caught. The producers inserted a title card depicting three officers in the See no evil, hear no evil, speak no evil stance with the words "the producers gratefully acknowledge the official cooperation of absolutely nobody".

It was the first in a series of successful satirical comedies made by the Boulting brothers. Their 1959 comedy, I'm All Right Jack, featured many of the same actors and characters. Many references are made to the events of Private's Progress.

Reception
The film was the second most popular movie at the British box office in 1956.

The New York Times wrote, "the Boultings have come up with an ingenious story and injected hilarious moments. But the whole thing sparkles and fizzles."

References

External links
 
 

1956 comedy films
1950s satirical films
1956 films
British black-and-white films
British comedy films
British satirical films
1950s English-language films
Films based on British novels
Films directed by John Boulting
Films scored by John Addison
Military humor in film
British World War II films
1950s British films